Monroe Township is a township in Nodaway County, in the U.S. state of Missouri.

Monroe Township was erected in 1881 and named after President James Monroe.

References

Townships in Missouri
Townships in Nodaway County, Missouri